Ember, formerly Sandbag or Sandbag Climate Campaign, is an environmental non-profit think tank, campaigning to reduce the use of coal. Based in the UK, the organisation was launched in 2008 by Bryony Worthington and was the first (and founding) member of The Guardians Environment Network.

Launch

Sandbag Climate Campaign was launched as a campaign on the European Union's Emission Trading Scheme, allowing its members to campaign to reduce the number of permits in circulation and to purchase permits and cancel them. Large corporations (such as vehicle manufacturers) must obtain these permits from the EU if they need to emit greenhouse gases during production. The purchase of these permits by the public prevents their use by corporations. Worthington described her organisation as "a bit like burning money in front of someone so they can't spend it on something bad."

Worthington gave the first public talk on Sandbag (as well as emissions trading in general) at a geeKyoto meeting in London during May 2008.

In 2018, 10 years since its launch, Sandbag registered a Brussels-based organinsation, Sandbag Climate Campaign ASBL. As of 2020, this became the main Sandbag office for EU policies. Sandbag's current EU Engagement is led by Suzana Carp.

Current focus

Ember (formerly Sandbag) currently produces research and campaigns on EU ETS and EU climate policy coal power plants, reducing emissions in industry, and reform of the Effort Sharing Regulation, as well as reform of the European Union Emissions Trading System.

The company is based at The Fisheries, 1 Mentmore Terrace, London Fields, E8 3PN.

References

External links 

 Organisation website

Climate change organisations based in the United Kingdom
Emissions trading
Environmental organisations based in England
Non-profit organisations based in the United Kingdom
Coal phase-out